

Films

References

Films
2005
2005-related lists